

Educational institutions 

 St. Martin's University, Lacey, Washington, United States
 St. Matthew's University, the Cayman Islands
 St. Michaels University School, Victoria, British Columbia, Canada
 Saint Monica University, Cameroon
 Samuel Merritt University, Oakland, California, US
 Sangmyung University, Seoul and Cheonan, South Korea
 Sefako Makgatho Health Sciences University, Limpopo, South Africa
 Shanghai Maritime University, China
 Sikkim Manipal University, Gangtok, India
 Singapore Management University, Singapore
 Southern Medical University, Tonghe, Guangzhou, China
 Southern Methodist University, Dallas, Texas, US
 SMU Mustangs, athletic teams
 Southeastern Massachusetts University, now University of Massachusetts Dartmouth, US

Other uses 
 Scandinavian Monetary Union, defunct
 Somray language
 Source measure unit, a type of test equipment
 Special Mission Unit, a type of military unit
 Suburban Multiple Unit (Queensland Rail)
 Suriname Men United, a gay men's organization
 Svenska Missionskyrkans Ungdom Scout
 System Management Unit, in Apple computers
 Finnish Seafarers' Union